Hypouricemia or hypouricaemia is a level of uric acid in blood serum that is below normal.  In humans, the normal range of this blood component has a lower threshold set variously in the range of 2 mg/dL to 4 mg/dL, while the upper threshold is 530 μmol/L (6 mg/dL) for women and 619 μmol/L (7 mg/dL) for men.  Hypouricemia usually is benign and sometimes is a sign of a medical condition.

Presentation

Complications
Although normally benign, idiopathic renal hypouricemia may increase the risk of exercise-induced acute kidney failure. There is also evidence that hypouricemia can worsen conditions such as rheumatoid arthritis, especially when combined with low Vitamin C uptake, due to free radical damage.

Causes
Hypouricemia is not a medical condition itself (i.e., it is benign), but it is a useful medical sign.  Usually hypouricemia is due to drugs and toxic agents, sometimes it is due to diet or genetics, and rarely it is due to an underlying medical condition.  When one of these causal medical conditions is present, hypouricemia is a common sign.

Medication
The majority of drugs that contribute to hypouricemia are uricosurics (drugs that increase the excretion of uric acid from the blood into the urine).  Others include drugs that reduce the production of uric acid:  xanthine oxidase inhibitors, urate oxidase (rasburicase), and sevelamer.

Diet
Hypouricemia is common in vegetarians due to the low purine content of most vegetarian diets.  Vegetarian diet has been found to result in mean serum uric acid values as low as 239 μ mol/L (2.7 mg/dL). While a vegetarian diet is typically seen as beneficial with respect to conditions such as gout, care should be taken to avoid associated health conditions.

Transient hypouricemia sometimes is produced by total parenteral nutrition.  Paradoxically, total parenteral nutrition may produce hypouricemia followed shortly by acute gout, a condition normally associated with hyperuricemia.  The reasons for this are unclear.

Genetics
Genetic mutations known to cause hypouricemia are of two kinds:  mutations causing xanthine oxidase deficiency, which reduces the production of uric acid;  and mutations causing abnormal kidney function that increases the excretion of uric acid.  Collectively known as familial renal hypouricemia, these latter mutations are of two types, involving defects of presecretory and postsecretory reabsorption.

A genetic mutation in Dalmatian dogs causes hypouricemia due to a kidney defect that interferes with reabsorption of uric acid.  A similar mutation has been reported in a human brother and sister.

In humans, loss-of-function mutations in the gene URAT1 are associated with presecretory reabsorption defects.

Medical conditions
Medical conditions that can cause hypouricemia include:
 Fanconi syndrome
 Hyperthyroidism
 Multiple sclerosis
 Myeloma
 Nephritis
 Wilson's disease
 Purine nucleoside phosphorylase (PNP) deficiency

Diagnosis
Uric acid clearance should also be performed, increase in clearance points to proximal tubular defects in the kidney, normal or reduced clearance points to a defect in xanthine oxidase.

Treatment
Idiopathic hypouricemia usually requires no treatment.  In some cases, hypouricemia is a medical sign of an underlying condition that does require treatment.  For example, if hypouricemia reflects high excretion of uric acid into the urine (hyperuricosuria) with its risk of uric acid nephrolithiasis, the hyperuricosuria may require treatment.

Drugs and dietary supplements that may be helpful
 Inositol
 Antiuricosurics

Prevalence
In one study, hypouricemia was found in 4.8% of hospitalized women and 6.5% of hospitalized men. (The definition was less than 0.14 mmol/L for women and less than 0.20 mmol/L in men.)

See also
 Hyperuricemia

References

External links 

Uric acid
Abnormal clinical and laboratory findings for blood